To reconfigure refers to:

 Reconfigurable computing: changing the data path of a computing system in addition to the control flow
 Control reconfiguration: changing the loop structure and controller parameters in an automatic control loop
 Reconfigurable antenna: changing the antenna physically or electrically to control its antenna properties